Marc Somers (born 28 June 1961) is a Belgian former professional racing cyclist. He rode in the 1984 Tour de France.

References

External links
 

1961 births
Living people
Belgian male cyclists
Cyclists from Antwerp Province
People from Duffel